Renato Steffen (born 3 November 1991) is a Swiss professional footballer who plays as a winger for Swiss Super League club Lugano and the Switzerland national team.

Club career

Youth football 
Steffen played his youth football with local club FC Erlinsbach. He played three years in the Aarau U-14 and U-16 youth teams. He then transferred to SC Schöftland and spent another four years with them.

Solothurn and Thun 
Steffen played amateur football in the 1. Liga Classic for Solothurn. After one season he transferred to Thun in July 2012 and made his professional debut on 2 September 2012 in the game against Servette FC. He scored 4 goals in 19 games for Thun in the 2012–13 Swiss Super League that season.

Young Boys 
At the end of that season Steffen was sold for €500.000 to Young Boys. Here he signed a four-year deal in Bern.

Basel 
During the winter break of the 2015–16 Super League, on 12 January, Basel announced that Steffen had signed a four-and-a-half-year contract with them. Steffen played his first team league debut for Basel on 7 February, coming in as a substitute in the 74th minute, in the home game in the St. Jakob-Park against Luzern. He scored his first goal for his new club in the same game, it was the final goal of the match in the 85 minute and Basel won the game 3–0.

Under trainer Urs Fischer Steffen won the Swiss Super League championship with Basel at the end of their 2015–16 season season. Again at the end of the 2016–17 Super League season Basel won the league title. For the club this was the eighth title in a row and their 20th championship title in total. They also won the Swiss Cup for the twelfth time that season, which meant they had won the double for the sixth time in the club's history.

During the winter break of their 2017–18 season Steffan left the club and signed for VfL Wolfsburg. During his two years with the club Steffan played a total of 112 games for Basel scoring a total of 23 goals. 61 of these games were in the Swiss Super League, seven in the Swiss Cup, 16 in the UEFA competitions (Champios League and Europa League) and 28 were friendly games. He scored 15 goal in the domestic league, two in the cup, two in the European games and the other four were scored during the test games.

Wolfsburg 
On 10 January 2018, Steffen signed a three and a half year deal with VfL Wolfsburg. The transfer fee was reported as being €1.75 million. He scored the first Wolfsburg goal after the temporary cancellation of the Bundesliga because of the COVID-19 pandemic in Germany, against FC Augsburg with a header from the edge of the box.

Lugano 
On 30 August 2022, Steffen signed a three-year contract with Lugano.

International career 
Steffen made his first appearance for Switzerland on 9 October 2015, in a Euro 2016 qualifier against San Marino. He was subbed on in the 78th minute of a 7–0 victory.

In May 2019, he Steffen played in the 2019 UEFA Nations League Finals, where his team finished fourth. He then started for Switzerland against Germany in a 2020–21 UEFA Nations League match.

Steffen was forced to sit out of UEFA Euro 2020, due to injury. Following the tournament, he returned to the national team and was frequently chosen in the starting lineup for 2022 World Cup qualifying matches. On 12 October 2021, Steffen scored his first international goal for Switzerland against Lithuania.

Career statistics

Club

International

Scores and results list Switzerland's goal tally first, score column indicates score after each Steffen goal.

Honours 
FC Basel
 Swiss Super League: 2015–16, 2016–17
 Swiss Cup: 2016–17

References

External links
Profile season 2017/18 on the Swiss Football League homepage

1991 births
People from Aarau
Sportspeople from Aargau
Living people
Swiss men's footballers
Switzerland international footballers
Association football wingers
FC Solothurn players
FC Thun players
BSC Young Boys players
FC Basel players
VfL Wolfsburg players
FC Lugano players
Swiss Super League players
Bundesliga players
2022 FIFA World Cup players
Swiss expatriate footballers
Swiss expatriate sportspeople in Germany
Expatriate footballers in Germany